Get Smart is a 2008 American action spy comedy film directed by Peter Segal, written by Tom J. Astle and Matt Ember and produced by Leonard B. Stern, who is also the producer of the original series. The film is based on Mel Brooks and Buck Henry's television series of the same name.

The film stars Steve Carell, Anne Hathaway, Dwayne Johnson, and Alan Arkin, with Terence Stamp and James Caan in supporting roles. Bernie Kopell, who played Siegfried in the original series, also appeared in the film. The film centers on an analyst named Maxwell Smart (Carell) who dreams of becoming a real field agent and a better spy. The film was released in North America on June 20, 2008.

Get Smart received mixed reviews from critics but was a commercial success, earning $230 million on an $80 million budget.

Plot
Maxwell Smart, an analyst for the top secret American intelligence agency, CONTROL, yearns to become a field agent like his idol, Agent 23. Despite top scores in the acceptance tests, Smart is denied the promotion due to his higher value as an analyst. When CONTROL headquarters is attacked by the terrorist organization KAOS, almost all of CONTROL's agents' identities are exposed, leaving only Agent 99 as a viable field operative. Smart is also promoted to field agent as Agent 86, but the experienced 99 is reluctant to partner with him due to his inexperience.  On the first day of his new job, Smart receives a Swiss Army knife which includes special add-ons like a miniature flamethrower and a crossbow that shoots darts attached to spider web thread.

While on a plane to Moscow, Agent 99 spots a threatening looking man in the back. She suspects he is an assassin, but Smart brushes it off as profiling.  Max notices gum on his shoe and tries to remove it with a matchstick.  When passengers assume Max is attempting to blow up the aircraft, he is tackled by an Air Marshal and his hands are put into zip ties. Max requests to use the bathroom, and while inside attempts to break his zip ties using the crossbow on his pocketknife. He does finally break the zip tie, but one of the darts hits the "eject" button and leaves him plummeting towards the earth with no parachute. Agent 99 follows with a parachute, as does the assassin. The latter is prevented from making all three crash when Agent 99 kisses him, surprising him enough for her to deploy the parachute. The assassin crashes in a barn, and Agent 99 and Smart assume he is dead, though he is berated by her for the incident.

The two arrive at the mansion of KAOS' chief bomb-maker, Ladislas Krstic, during a party. Upon the completion of an intense dance-off they infiltrate the main office and trace nuclear material to a KAOS nuclear weapons factory disguised as a Moscow bakery. They are caught by Krstic and his men, but eliminate all of them successfully. In the bakery, Smart meets with KAOS boss Siegfried and his second-in-command, Shtarker, only to learn that a double-agent has compromised their identities. Smart manages to escape and destroy the weapons factory, but he and Agent 99 are confronted by the same man that they had assumed dead earlier. All seems lost, but Smart recognizes the man as Dalip, who was in a recording taken during Smart's time as an analyst. He gives Dalip advice on fixing his failing marriage, and Dalip promptly lets them go.

The Chief sends Agent 23 to observe the cleanup of the factory, but KAOS sneaks the weapons out through the Moskva River beforehand, leaving Agent 23 convinced that only a bakery had been destroyed. Realizing that Smart was alone during his key discoveries, CONTROL believes him to be the double agent. Agent 99, who has gradually been developing feelings with Smart, is heartbroken but takes him into custody, just when he starts suspecting that she is the double agent. Meanwhile, conferring with Shtarker, Siegfried plans to detonate a nuclear bomb in Los Angeles while the President is in the city.

Siegfried contacts the U.S. government during a meeting attended by the Chief and the Vice President and threatens to release nuclear weapon detonator codes to hostile countries unless he is paid a ransom of $200 billion. The members of the meeting, especially the Vice President (who has intense enmity towards the Chief), do not take the call seriously, to the Chief's dismay. While Smart is in a CONTROL holding cell, Dalip sends him a coded message via the radio show American Top 40 posing as his girlfriend, alerting him to Siegfried's plan. Smart escapes and arrives in Los Angeles to reunite with the Chief, Agent 99, and Agent 23. He convinces them that he is not the double agent. Meanwhile, as the President arrives at the Disney Hall for a concert, Siegfried, Shtarker and Dalip plant the bomb in the concert hall. When Smart's Geiger counter-equipped watch picks up traces of radiation from Agent 23, they realize Agent 23 is the real double agent.

Agent 23 takes Agent 99 hostage and flees in a vehicle. After a chase, Smart manages to rescue Agent 99, but in the struggle, the car is set on fire and forced onto railroad tracks. Smart kisses Agent 23 to distract him, a trick learned from Agent 99. He and Agent 99 are thrown off the vehicle before it collides with a freight train, killing Agent 23. After analyzing Agent 23's nuclear football, Smart realizes that the bomb will be triggered by the final note of Beethoven's "Ode to Joy". They rush to the Disney Hall, and Smart tackles the elderly conductor just before the final note, saving the President and Los Angeles. Siegfried, despite his plan failing, is satisfied with Dalip's performance and promises not to kill his wife as he would have had Dalip failed, but states that he would be 'doing the sighted world a favor' if he did. In response, Dalip throws Siegfried into a river, much to Shtarker's delight.

Back in CONTROL headquarters, a party is held in Smart's honor, where Agent 99 gives him a puppy. Smart is afterwards given honors and gets his dream of becoming a real spy. While leaving, Smart attempts to fix a jammed door, and ends up jammed between the sliding doors as a humorous ending shot, and the film cuts to black, and Smart angrily yells (offscreen) "You gotta be kidding me!"

Cast

 Steve Carell as Maxwell Smart
 Anne Hathaway as Agent 99
 Dwayne Johnson as Agent 23
 Alan Arkin as The Chief
 Terence Stamp as Siegfried
 Masi Oka as Bruce
 Nate Torrence as Lloyd
 Dalip Singh as Dalip
 Ken Davitian as Shtarker
 Terry Crews as Agent 91, a CONTROL agent.
 David Koechner as Larabee
 James Caan as The President
 David S. Lee as Ladislas Krstic
 Bill Murray as Agent 13
 Patrick Warburton as Hymie
 John Farley as Agent 38
 Larry Miller as CIA Agent
 Kevin Nealon as CIA Agent
 Blake Clark as General
 Cedric Yarbrough as Tate
 Stephen Dunham as Secret Service Commander

Bernie Kopell, who played Siegfried in the original TV series, has a cameo as a motorist. Ryan Seacrest made a voice cameo as himself, hosting American Top 40

Soundtrack
This film's score was composed by former Yes guitarist Trevor Rabin, who had previously scored films such as Armageddon, Enemy of the State and Deep Blue Sea.

Track listing

Marketing
In addition to traditional television advertisement and movie trailers, Warner Bros. commissioned Pepsi to produce a flavor of Sierra Mist soft drink dubbed "Undercover Orange" to help promote the film. In Latin America, Get Smart was shown in a Spanish language dubbed version, produced in Mexico. The theatrical posters had a sticker that highlighted the return of Jorge "El Tata" Arvizu, a highly regarded Mexican actor who was returning to the character after a 13-year hiatus, having dubbed Don Adams in the 1960s TV series and again in the short-lived 1990s Get Smart TV series starring Andy Dick.

Reception

Critical response

On Rotten Tomatoes, the film has a 51% rating based on 223 reviews with an average rating of 5.60/10. The site's critical consensus reads "Get Smart rides Steve Carell's considerable charm for a few laughs, but ultimately proves to be a rather ordinary action comedy". Metacritic gave the film a score of 54 out of 100, based on 34 critics, indicating "mixed or average reviews".

The film received positive reviews from Roger Ebert and Lisa Schwarzbaum from Entertainment Weekly. Richard Roeper of the Chicago Sun-Times also gave the film a thumbs up, saying that it was "one of the more pleasant surprises of the year". Critic James Berardinelli also gave it a positive review.

Negative responses came from Glenn Whipp of the Los Angeles Daily News calling it "staggeringly bad" and Mick LaSalle of the San Francisco Chronicle stating that "It couldn't buy a laugh in a nitrous oxide factory with a fistful of clown noses." Kenneth Turan of the Los Angeles Times said "it neglects the laughs and amps up the action, resulting in a not very funny comedy joined at the hip to a not very exciting spy movie."

It also received negative reviews from Richard Schickel from Time and David Ansen from Newsweek, with the latter stating, "it's not Maxwell who's clueless, but the filmmakers ... Director (Pete) Segal ... is a comedy specialist lacking any apparent sense of humor."

Box office
Get Smart grossed $130.3 million domestically and $100.3 million internationally, bringing its worldwide total to $230.7 million. In its opening weekend, the film grossed $38.6 million in 3,911 theaters in the United States and Canada, ranking #1 at the box office and averaging $9,891 per venue. The film was released in the United Kingdom on August 22, 2008, and opened on #3, behind Hellboy II: The Golden Army and Mamma Mia!.

Home media

Get Smart was released on DVD and Blu-ray on November 4, 2008 by Warner Home Video. Two versions of the film were released: the theatrical version and an enhanced version that allows viewers to view alternate takes and deleted scenes placed within the context of the film.

The film was released on DVD in the United Kingdom on February 23, 2009. Approximately 2,088,163 DVD units were sold, translating to revenue of $34,652,714 (Blu-ray sales/rentals not included).

Future

DVD spin-off
A spin-off film, Get Smart's Bruce and Lloyd: Out of Control (featuring Oka, Torrence, Miller, Warburton, Crews and a cameo by Hathaway reprising their roles), was released on DVD on July 1, 2008, eleven days after the feature film's theatrical release. The film tells a standalone story that takes place concurrently with the events within the film (including a scene in which Agent 99 calls Lloyd and angrily berates him for the poor quality of her gadgets compared to Max's; that scene takes place immediately after Max accidentally renders himself unconscious with a blowgun during a stakeout in the main film).

Cancelled sequel
On October 7, 2008, it was reported that Warner Bros. and Village Roadshow Pictures were producing a sequel. Carell, Hathaway, and Arkin were set to return, but the status of other cast members had yet to be announced. In July 2010, Steve Carell stated that he had recently been given a potential script for the sequel to Get Smart, but had passed on it. He said that he was still very interested in eventually making a Get Smart sequel, but was willing to wait until a decent script was developed.

In 2010, Carell said: "I took a pass at Get Smart 2, write a completely new story and we'll see what happens with that somewhere down the line perhaps... Anne Hathaway is definitely in and Alan Arkin, so at some point... we don't have any projected date and the script still needs some tweaking and some rewriting."

During 2013, Carell stated that it was unlikely that there really would be a sequel. In December 2013, however, Peter Segal claimed a Get Smart 2 had been close to being made, with the "funny script" written by Carell himself.

By 2019, Segal stated that too much time had passed for a Get Smart sequel to be viable.

Awards & nominations

References

External links

 
 
 
 
 
 

Get Smart films
2008 films
2008 action comedy films
2000s action adventure films
2000s adventure comedy films
2000s American films
2000s English-language films
2000s spy action films
2000s spy comedy films
Adaptations of works by Mel Brooks
American action adventure films
American action comedy films
American adventure comedy films
American spy action films
American spy comedy films
Atlas Entertainment films
Films based on television series
Films directed by Peter Segal
Films produced by Charles Roven
Films scored by Trevor Rabin
Films shot in Montreal
Films shot in Moscow
Village Roadshow Pictures films
Warner Bros. films